Banyumas Sundanese is a Sundanese dialect which was previously spoken by some people in the southwest region of the province of Central Java precisely in Dermaji village, Lumbir district and southern Gumelar district in Banyumas Regency and parts of the Bantarsari and Karangpucung district in Cilacap Regency. The Sundanese spoken in Dermaji village includes Sundanese which is classified as rough or does not know the level of language. Dermaji people call it the term Sundanese "badeolan".

History
The area which is the center for speaking the Banyumas Sundanese language is located in Cijurig village. Word "ci" in Sundanese means "water", whereas "jurig" is "ghost", demit in Standard Sundanese. Cijurig village is located in Dermaji sub-district, Lumbir district, Banyumas Regency. Banyumas Regency is an area where people speak Banyumasan Javanese. Besides Cijurig, in this village there are also many other village with Sundanese names. Among them, Cibrewek, Citunggul, Cireang, Ciposing, Cimencos, and others.

There is no primary source, either inscription or written text that explains the early history of Dermaji sub-district. The history of Dermaji Village is only understood from oral stories passed down from generation to generation. From the oral stories it is believed that Dermaji is one of the villages whose existence is quite old. Dermaji village is thought to have existed during the founding of Galuh Kingdom in West Java in the 6th century.

Because it is included in the territory of the Galuh Kingdom, which is Sundanese culture, the life of the people of Dermaji sub-district cannot be separated from the influence of Sundanese culture. The biggest influence can be seen from the language spoken by the residents of Dermaji sub-district. Based on research conducted by Professor of Linguistics Padjadjaran University (UNPAD) Bandung, Cece Sobarna, in 1989, concluded that Sundanese language was once the spoken language of the majority of the Dermaji people. Names of places and rivers like Cireang, Cukangawi, Cipancur, Citunggul, Cipeundeuy, Cibrewek, and so on show that there is a strong influence of Sundanese in Dermaji sub-district.

See also 
Sundanese language
Banten Sundanese
Brebes Sundanese
Cirebon Sundanese
Indramayu Sundanese

References

External links

Sundanese language
Banyumas Regency